Governor Harvey may refer to:

James M. Harvey (politician) (1833–1894), 5th Governor of Kansas
John Harvey (Albemarle) (died 1679), Governor of Albemarle Sound in 1679
John Harvey (British Army officer) (1778–1852), Governor of Newfoundland from 1841 to 1846
John Harvey (Virginia governor) (died 1646), Crown Governor of Virginia from 1628 to 1635 and from 1637 to 1639
Louis P. Harvey (1820–1862), 7th Governor of Wisconsin
Matthew Harvey (1781–1866), 13th Governor of New Hampshire
Wilson Godfrey Harvey (1866–1932), 94th Governor of South Carolina